The Second Wife (translit. El Zawga El Thania) is a 1967 Egyptian drama film directed by Salah Abu Seif.

Cast
 Soad Hosny as Fatma
 Shoukry Sarhan as Abou El Ela
 Sanaa Gamil as Hafiza
 Salah Mansour
 Soheir El Morshedi
 Abdelmonem Ibrahim
 Hassan El Baroudy

References

External links
 

1967 films
1960s Arabic-language films
1967 drama films
Films directed by Salah Abu Seif
Egyptian black-and-white films
Egyptian drama films